Marvel Comics is an American comic book company.  These are some of the people (artists, editors, executives, writers) who have been associated with the company in its history, as Marvel and its predecessors, Timely Comics and Atlas Comics.

 Jack Abel a.k.a. "Gary Michaels"
 Art Adams
 Dan Adkins
 Vince Alascia
Alfredo Alcala
Vicente Alcazar
 Ross Andru
 Avi Arad
 Ruth Atkinson a.k.a. "Ruth Atkinson Ford"
 Chuck Austen
 Al Avison
 Dick Ayers
 Mark Bagley
Ken Bald
Brent Peeples
Violet Barclay
 Clive Barker
 Max Bemis
 Robert Bernstein a.k.a. "R. Berns"
 Brian Michael Bendis
 Tom Brevoort
 Sol Brodsky
 Ed Brubaker
 Frank Brunner
 Steve Buccellato
 Rich Buckler
 Dan Buckley
 Carl Burgos
 John Buscema
 Sal Buscema
 Kurt Busiek
 John Byrne
Vic Carrabotta
 Hank Chapman
 Bobbie Chase
 Frank Chiaramonte
 Chris Claremont
 Dave Cockrum
 Gene Colan a.k.a. "Adam Austin"
 Vince Colletta
 Gerry Conway
 Johnny Craig
Paris Cullins
Jon D'Agostino a.k.a. "Johnny Dee"
 Peter David
 Gene Day
 Tom DeFalco
Tony DeZuniga
 Tony DiPreta
 Steve Dillon
 Steve Ditko
 Arnold Drake
 Jo Duffy a.k.a. Mary Jo Duffy
 Harlan Ellison
 Steve Englehart
 Garth Ennis
 Steve Epting
 Mike Esposito (comics) a.k.a. "Mickey Demeo", "Mickey Dee". "Joe Guadioso"
 Bill Everett
 Glenn Fabry
 Vincent Fago
 Danny Fingeroth
 Linda Fite
 Gary Friedrich
 Mike Friedrich
 Al Gabriele
 Neil Gaiman
 David Gallaher
 Steve Gerber
 Frank Giacoia a.k.a. "Frank Ray"
 Stan Goldberg a.k.a. "Stan G."
 Michael Golden
 Archie Goodwin
 Martin Goodman
 Billy Graham (comics)
Sam Grainger
 Mark Gruenwald
 Paul Gulacy
 Caesar Crawford
 Paul Gustavson
 Ed Hannigan
 Ernie Hart a.k.a. "H.E. Huntley"
 Bob Harras
 Al Hartley
 Russ Heath
 Don Heck
 Carl Icahn
 Tony Isabella
 Bill Jemas
 Paul Jenkins
 Klaus Janson
 Arvell Jones
 Carol Kalish
 Gil Kane a.k.a. "Scott Edwards"
 Jack Keller (comics)
 Sam Kieth
 Fred Kida
 Jack Kirby
 George Klein (comics)
 Annette Kawecki
 Daniel Keyes
 Scott Kolins
 David Anthony Kraft
 Adam Kubert
 Andy Kubert
 Joe Kubert
 Erik Larsen
 Leon Lazarus
 Elaine Lee
 Jae Lee
 Jim Lee
 Stan Lee
 Steve Leialoha
 Rick Leonardi
 Larry Lieber
 Rob Liefeld
 Scott Lobdell
 Pauline Loth
 Frank Lovece
 Ralph Macchio
 David W. Mack
 Howard Mackie
 Leonardo Manco
 Joe Maneely
 Pablo Marcos
 Val Mayerik
 Todd McFarlane
 Don McGregor
 Frank McLaughlin
 Marcus McLaurin
 Pop Mhan
 David Michelinie
 Mike Mignola
 Mark Millar
 Frank Miller
 Peter Milligan
 Paul S. Newman
 Doug Moench
 Jim Mooney
 Jon J. Muth
 Charles Nicholas
 Fabian Nicieza
 Alex Niño
 Ann Nocenti
 Jim Novak
 Michael Avon Oeming
 Mike Okamoto
 Glynis Oliver
 Joe Orlando
 Tom Orzechowski
 James Owsley (see Christopher Priest)
 Jimmy Palmiotti
 Lisa Patrick
 Ronald Perelman
 George Pérez
 Don Perlin
 Ike Perlmutter
 Mike Ploog
 Keith Pollard
 Whilce Portacio
 Carl Potts
 Bob Powell (comics)
 Christopher Priest
 Howard Purcell
 Joe Quesada
 Nestor Redondo
 Ralph Reese
 Paul Reinman
 Don Rico a.k.a. "N. Korok"
 James Robinson
 Marshall Rogers
 John Romita, Jr.
 John Romita, Sr.
 Werner Roth (comics) a.k.a. "Jay Gavin"
 Joe Rosen
 Sam Rosen
 Alex Ross
 George Roussos a.k.a. "George Bell"
 Josef Rubinstein
 Greg Rucka
 Christopher Rule
 P. Craig Russell
 Jim Salicrup
 Christie Scheele
 Alex Schomburg
 Mike Sekowsky
 John Severin
 Marie Severin
 Jim Shooter
 Syd Shores
 Jerry Siegel
 Bill Sienkiewicz
 Marc Silvestri
 Artie Simek
 Joe Simon
 Louise Simonson
 Walt Simonson
 Joe Sinnott
 Steve Skroce
 Dan Slott
 Kevin Smith
 Mickey Spillane
 Frank Springer
 Jim Starlin
 Flo Steinberg
 Jim Steranko
 Roger Stern
 Chic Stone
 J. Michael Straczynski
 Tom Sutton
 John Tartaglione
 Roy Thomas
 Pete Tumlinson
 George Tuska
 John Verpoorten
 Brian K. Vaughan
 Mike Vosburg
 Mark Waid
 Larry Wachowski
 Len Wein
 Morris Weiss
 Joss Whedon
 Ogden Whitney
 Anthony Williams (comics)
 Al Williamson
 Ron Wilson
 Barry Windsor-Smith a.k.a. "Barry Smith"
 Ed Winiarski
 David Wohl
 Marv Wolfman
 Wally Wood

See also
List of Marvel Comics nicknames
List of comic creators
List of comics creators appearing in comics
Women in comics

References
 The Grand Comics Database
Unofficial Handbook of Marvel Comics Creators
 Secret Identities
 A to Z in Marvel Comic Creators

People
Lists of comics creators
Lists of people by employer